Spring and Fall may refer to:

 "Spring and Fall" (poem), a poem by Gerard Manley Hopkins
 Spring and Fall (album), a 2012 album by Paul Kelly
 Spring & Fall, an Australian anthology television series

See also
 Spring and All